Original Underground Music from the Mysterious South is an album of American guitarist Norman Blake and the Rising Fawn String Ensemble, released in 1982.

Track listing
 "New Brick Road" – 3:25
 "Dusty Rose" – 3:45
 "Walnut River" – 2:12
 "Pig on the Engine" – 2:45
 "Third Street Gypsy Rag" – 2:58
 "Georgia Home" – 2:52
 "Peezlewhister" – 3:40
 "Old Fiddler's Roll Call" – 2:04
 "Pueblo" – 2:41
 "The Toneality" – 3:28
 "Natasha's Waltz" – 4:05
 "Blake's March" – 2:25

Personnel
Norman Blake – guitar, banjo, mandolin, fiddle
Peter Ostroushko – mandolin, fiddle, guitar
Nancy Blake – cello, mandolin
Carl Jones – guitar, mandola, mandolin, banjo
Larry Sledge – mandocello

References

External links
Rounder Records entry

1982 albums
Norman Blake (American musician) albums
Peter Ostroushko albums